Dead in the Water is a 1991 American black comedy crime television film directed by Bill Condon. It is based on the 1958 novel Web of Murder by author Harry Whittington and stars Bryan Brown and Teri Hatcher. The film premiered on the USA Network on December 4, 1991.

Plot
Charlie Deegan is a lawyer who married into his wife Olivia's wealthy family but has become unhappy in their relationship and has become involved in an affair with his assistant Laura. Charlie wants to divorce Olivia, but their prenuptial agreement would prevent him from getting any money, meaning that he will not be able to transition to his dream job as a judge because it pays less than being a lawyer.

Charlie sleeps with Olivia's friend Victoria to misdirect her from his real affair. He then convinces Olivia to go with him to a cabin to work out their problems, where he drowns her in the nearby lake. Charlie and Laura place Olivia's body and various red herring clues in a car that they dump in the water. Several days later Laura's body is found and Charlie is a suspect. Victoria tells Charlie that she had him followed and knew about his affair with Laura, which angered her. She agrees to keep quiet if he agrees to marry her once Olivia is declared dead. Charlie is once again stuck in an unhappy relationship and is then visited by Lou, Laura's secret husband.

Cast
 Bryan Brown as Charlie Deegan
 Teri Hatcher as Laura Stewart
 Anne DeSalvo as Olivia Deegan
 Veronica Cartwright as Victoria Haines
 Seymour Cassel as Lt. Frank Vaness
 Pruitt Taylor Vince as Lou Rescetti
 Anna Thomson as Edie Meyers
 Ron Karabatsos as Mike Welch
 Daniel Reichert as Jack Homelin
 Tim Haldeman as Prosecutor
 Tom Wright as Hotel Clerk
 Ralph Oliver as Trial Judge
 Eric Christmas as Judge Griffin
 Michael Kaufman as Neurosurgeon
 C.H. Evans as Lodge Manager
 Jo Farkas as Manager's Wife
 Jack Orend as Coroner
 Ernie Lively as Dignitary
 Brent Hinkley as Lake Guard
 Wolf Wirth as Waiter

Reception
Reviewer Peter Sobczynski of rogerebert.com called the film a "low-budget [...] potboiler".

References

External links
 

1991 television films
1991 films
1991 comedy films
1991 crime films
1990s American films
1990s black comedy films
1990s crime comedy films
1990s English-language films
American black comedy films
American crime comedy films
American comedy television films
Crime television films
Films about adultery in the United States
Films about lawyers
Films about murder
Films based on American crime novels
Films based on American thriller novels
Films based on mystery novels
Films directed by Bill Condon
Television films based on books
USA Network original films
Uxoricide in fiction